The A 1—Autoestrada do Norte—is the biggest and the most important highway in Portugal. It connects the two largest cities in Portugal, Lisbon and Porto, also passing by some district capitals and industrial zones. Being the most important connection between two major cities, it was designed to be parallel to other roads, like the EN1.

At 303 km long, the highway starts in Lisbon, in the interchange between the CRIL and the Vasco da Gama Bridge. Then the road goes along some cities near Lisbon, mainly Alverca do Ribatejo and Alenquer. Near Torres Novas it connects with the A23, a road that connects the A1 with Castelo Branco and Vilar Formoso, by the A25, near the border with Spain. This interchange marks the end of the 3x3 profile that started in Lisbon, to start a profile of 2 lanes.

The highway is owned by Brisa. A trip between Lisbon and Porto using the A1 costs €22.20.

Exits

Lisbon - Porto

References 

 A1 – Auto-estrada do Norte on BRISA - Auto-estradas de Portugal S. A. Web site

Motorways in Portugal